CBAL-FM is a Canadian radio station, which broadcasts SRC's Ici Musique network at 98.3 FM in Moncton, New Brunswick.

The station went on the air as CBAF-FM on April 15, 1983. For a long time, it was the only station in Radio-Canada's FM service that didn't serve any portion of Quebec. It adopted its current call sign in 1989 after Radio-Canada AM outlet CBAF moved to the FM band and picked up the CBAF-FM call letters.

Rebroadcasters

On February 2, 2006, the CRTC approved the CBC's application to decrease CBAL's effective radiated power from 77,000 watts to 67,600 watts and by increasing the antenna height.

References

External links
 

Bal
Bal
Bal
Radio stations established in 1983
1983 establishments in New Brunswick